Hoër Meisieskool Bloemhof is a public Afrikaans medium high school for girls, located in Stellenbosch in the Western Cape province of  South Africa.

History 
It was established in 1875 as an English girls' school. In 1903 three houses were acquired with the intention of accommodating more boarding and day students. In 1925 the school became an Afrikaans-medium girls school. As of 2017, the school principal is Wilna van Heerden. The school is located next to the Rhenish Girls' High School and opposite the Paul Roos Gymnasium for boys. It is further next to the Eerste River and Markotter sports grounds.

Students 
There are currently (2017) 715 girls enrolled in grade 8 through 12. The number of grade 12 students obtaining A symbols in their final year has increased from 38.6% in 2010 to 49.6% in 2016. The school's motto is Semper Fidelis, which means "always loyal" in Latin.

References 

Schools in South Africa
Education in South Africa